This article is about the particular significance of the year 1770 to Wales and its people.

Incumbents

Lord Lieutenant of Anglesey - Sir Nicholas Bayly, 2nd Baronet
Lord Lieutenant of Brecknockshire and Monmouthshire – Thomas Morgan of Rhiwpera 
Lord Lieutenant of Caernarvonshire - Thomas Wynn
Lord Lieutenant of Cardiganshire – Wilmot Vaughan, 1st Earl of Lisburne
Lord Lieutenant of Carmarthenshire – George Rice
Lord Lieutenant of Denbighshire - Richard Myddelton  
Lord Lieutenant of Flintshire - Sir Roger Mostyn, 5th Baronet 
Lord Lieutenant of Glamorgan – Other Windsor, 4th Earl of Plymouth
Lord Lieutenant of Merionethshire - William Vaughan
Lord Lieutenant of Montgomeryshire – Henry Herbert, 1st Earl of Powis 
Lord Lieutenant of Pembrokeshire – Sir William Owen, 4th Baronet
Lord Lieutenant of Radnorshire – Edward Harley, 4th Earl of Oxford and Earl Mortimer

Bishop of Bangor – John Ewer 
Bishop of Llandaff – Shute Barrington
Bishop of St Asaph – Jonathan Shipley
Bishop of St Davids – Charles Moss

Events
September - Sir Watkin Williams-Wynn, 4th Baronet, holds his legendary coming-of-age party, to which 15,000 guests are invited. Three coachloads of cooks are sent from London to provide the refreshments, and a hall is built especially for the occasion at Wynnstay.
Approximate date - Bridge at Pontardawe built by William Edwards.

Arts and literature

New books
Robert Jones (Calvinistic Methodist) - Lleferydd yr Asyn
Thomas Meredith - An Illustration of Several Texts of Scripture
John Walters - A Dissertation on the Welsh Language
Sir John Wynn, 1st Baronet - History of the Gwydir Family (posthumously published)

Music
Daines Barrington - Some Account of Two Musical Instruments Used in Wales

Births
15 January - Sir John Edwards, 1st Baronet, of Garth, politician (died 1850)
8 April - John Jenkins (Ifor Ceri), antiquarian (died 1829)
14 April - John Evans, explorer (died 1799)
30 April - David Thompson, explorer (died 1857)

Deaths
13 January - Howel Davies, Methodist leader, about 54
19 June - Thomas Williams, Congregational minister, about 45
8 August - John Jones, clergyman and author, 70

References

1770 by country
1770 in Great Britain